The 1903 Amherst football team represented Amherst College during the 1903 college football season. The team defeated Harvard.

Schedule

References

Amherst
Amherst Mammoths football seasons
Amhurst football